Silvio Grassetti (24 February 1936 – 9 September 2018) was an Italian professional Grand Prix motorcycle road racer.

Motorcycle racing career
Grassetti was born in Montecchio, Sant'Angelo in Lizzola. The son of a Benelli employee, he began his racing career as a privateer Benelli racer. He made his Grand Prix debut as a Benelli factory rider in 1959. His best year was in 1969 when he finished second to Giacomo Agostini in the 350cc world championship. In 1971, Grassetti won the 250cc Austrian and Belgian Grand Prix races, but inconsistent results relegated him to only seventh place in the championship. He retired in 1974 after suffering serious injuries at the Spa-Francorchamps circuit in Belgium. Grassetti won three Grand Prix races in his career.

References 

1936 births
2018 deaths
Sportspeople from the Province of Pesaro and Urbino
Italian motorcycle racers
250cc World Championship riders
350cc World Championship riders
500cc World Championship riders